Guilford School is a historic former schoolhouse, now housing commercial offices, on the east side of Downtown Cincinnati at 421 E 4th Street. The building is adjacent to Lytle Park is a contributing property to the Lytle Park Historic District.
  
Guilford School was dedicated May 16, 1914, and named for Nathan Guilford (1786-1854), an early advocate for Ohio education. The building stands on the site of Fort Washington and later also the boardinghouse where Stephen Foster, then a steamboat worker, stayed from 1846 to 1850.  It was designed by Frederick W. Garber.

It is now owned by Western & Southern Life Insurance.

References

Buildings and structures in Cincinnati
History of Cincinnati
Defunct schools in Ohio
School buildings completed in 1914
1914 establishments in Ohio